The Caudron C.240  was a four-seat touring aircraft produced in France in 1931. It was a single-engined, low-wing, cantilever monoplane constructed using wood and metal. It had fixed, conventional landing gear. 

It was presented for official tests at the STAé but it did not respond well to control input and did not receive its Certificate of Airworthiness.  Caudron were unable to find customers so further development was abandoned.

Specifications

References

External links
Уголок неба

1930s French sport aircraft
C.240
Low-wing aircraft
Aircraft first flown in 1931